The Dolomites SkyRace is an international skyrunning competition held for the first time in 1998. It runs every year in Italian Dolomites in July and consists of two races SkyRace and Vertical Kilometer both valid for the Skyrunner World Series.

Dolomites SkyRace

Men

Women

Dolomites Vertical Kilometer

Men

Women

See also 
 Skyrunner World Series

References

External links 
 Official web site

Skyrunning competitions
Skyrunner World Series
1998 establishments in Italy
Recurring sporting events established in 1998
Dolomites
Vertical kilometer running competitions